The Football League play-offs for the 1997–98 season were held in May 1998, with the finals taking place at the old Wembley Stadium in London. The play-off semi-finals were played over two legs and were contested by the teams who finish in 3rd, 4th, 5th and 6th place in the Football League First Division and Football League Second Division and the 4th, 5th, 6th and 7th placed teams in the Football League Third Division table. The winners of the semi-finals will go through to the finals, with the winner of the matches gaining promotion for the following season.

Background
The Football League play-offs have been held every year since 1987. They take place for each division following the conclusion of the regular season and are contested by the four clubs finishing below the automatic promotion places.

In the First Division, Sunderland, who are aiming to return to the top flight after relegation last season, finished 1 point behind second placed Middlesbrough, who in turn finished 3 points behind champions Nottingham Forest, who returned to the top flight after being relegated last season. Charlton Athletic, who are aiming to return to the top flight after 8 years outside the top division, finished in fourth place in the table. Ipswich Town, who are aiming to return to the top flight after 3 seasons outside the top division, finished in fifth place. Sheffield United, who are aiming to return to the top flight after a 4-year absence, finished 9 points behind Ipswich Town in sixth place. This means Sunderland and Sheffield United will play each other with Ipswich and Charlton playing each other just like in the 1987 playoffs only then Charlton were the First Division and Ipswich were in the Second Division.

First Division

Semi-finals
First leg

Second leg

Charlton Athletic won 2–0 on aggregate.

Sunderland won 3–2 on aggregate.

Final

Second Division

Semi-finals
First leg

Second leg

Grimsby Town won 2–1 on aggregate.

Northampton Town won 4–3 on aggregate.

Final

Third Division

Semi-finals
First leg

Second leg

Colchester United won 3–2 on aggregate.

Torquay United won 7–2 on aggregate.

Final

External links
Football League website

 
English Football League play-offs